Amjad Ali Khan is an Indian classical singer and teacher of Kirana Gharana.

He has performed all over the world and is the founder of Kirana Gharana Music Academy that teaches students classical music.

Early life and education
Amjad descends from the family lineage of Abdul Wahid Khan and Abdul Karim Khan, who were the founders of the Kirana Gharana. As the elder son of the vocalist Akhtar Nawaz Khan, he got education in music from his father and his maternal uncles Mashkoor Ali Khan and Mubarak Ali Khan.

Career
Khan has performed in many prestigious music festivals and concerts; such as Sawai Gandharva Bhimsen Festival, Pune in 2015, Harballabh Sangeet Sammelan in Jallandhar, Tihai Music Festival in Goa, Samrath Music Festival in Goa, Kalashree Mahotsav in Pune, Mangubai Music Festival in Goa, Delhi Youth Festival conducted by Ministry of Culture in Delhi, ARPAN and SHOPAN MAHOTSAV in DELHI, Yuva Pratibhotsav in Goa, "Khayal – the Colours of Indian Classical Vocal" organized in Lok Kala Manch, Delhi, Ganga Utsav in Varanasi, Nritya and Sangeet Sammelan organized by Pracheen Kala Kendra, Chandigarh, Shastriya, Nritya Vadya Yantra & Sangeet, IITF – Delhi, "Tribute to Ustad Munawar Ali Khan" organized by Sargam music society in IIT Delhi, etc.

He has conducted workshops for the propagation of Indian music for many organizations such as Sahitya Kala Parishad, SPIC MACAY, Shree Ram Center, Routes 2 Roots.

He is an empanelled artist in ICCR and has performed world over in places like China, Switzerland, Germany, Europe, Australia, etc.

He is the founder of Kirana Gharana Music Academy, a formal music school established with the vision of propagating Hindustani classical music and the gharana gayaki in a structured way. He aims to train the deserving talent irrespective of their social and economic class; he imparts free education to the under privileged children.

Awards and recognitions

He received the Bharat Ratna Pt. Bhimsen Joshi National Award in 2015. He is also the recipient of Rotary Club's Vocational Award for excellence in the field of music (2016), Surmani Award by 43rd Kal Ke Kalakar Sangeet Sammelan Mumbai (2004), Hari Vallabh Music Award (2003), Jhankar Music Award (2002), Kaka Saheb Gardgill Award (2000), Best Vocal Award (2000), and Suron ke Silsile Award (1999).

He received a scholarship from the Sahitya Kala Parishad and the Young and Talented Artist scholarship from Government of India, Department of Culture.

He is widely known for his overseas performances like  China Asian Festival 2004, Switzerland, Namaste India in Japan 2009, Vienna Music Festival, Germany, Greece, Dubai, Spain, Olympic Opening Ceremony in London, Moscow, and much more.

His performance in a concert  ‘A Tribute to Pt Deena Nath Mangeshkar’ organised by Prachin Kala Kendra Nritya is still remembered by many.

References

21st-century Indian male classical singers
Kirana gharana
Indian music educators
Living people
1980 births